Mouhamed Ndiaye may refer to:

Mouhamed Alga Ndiaye, Senegalese basketball player
Mouhamed N'Diaye, Senegalese footballer

See also
Mohamed N'Diaye